USS Centaurus may refer to one of these two ships of the United States Navy named after the constellation Centaurus:

 , launched on 3 September 1943 and acquired by the US Navy on 20 October 1943.
 , acquired from the US Army on 12 June 1951 and lent to South Korea the same day.

United States Navy ship names